Urkudelphis is an extinct genus of cetacean. The type species, Urkudelphis chawpipacha, was described in 2017 based on fossils found in the Dos Bocas Formation of Ecuador. It was a type of river dolphin.

References 

River dolphins
Oligocene mammals of South America
Deseadan
Paleogene Ecuador
Fossils of Ecuador
Fossil taxa described in 2017